() is a rope made of woven straw. It was an important household item used in pre-modern agricultural Korea.

History 

 was widely used until the 1960s. In the 1970s, the use of  waned with the spread of plastic, vinyl, and synthetic fiber ropes.  faced a resurgence at the end of the 20th century due to growing interest in traditional handicraft in recent decades.

Uses 

See also

References 

Agriculture in Korea
History of Korea
Ropes
Straw products
Korean words and phrases